A Boy Named Charlie Brown is a 1969 American animated film, produced by Cinema Center Films, distributed by National General Pictures, and directed by Bill Melendez. It is the first feature film based on the Peanuts comic strip. It was well-received and a box-office success, grossing $12 million.

Plot 
When Charlie Brown's baseball team loses the first game of the season, he becomes convinced that he will not win any of them. On the way to school one day, Lucy jokingly suggests that he enter the school spelling bee. However, Linus considers it a good idea and encourages him despite the jeers of Lucy, Violet, and Patty ("Failure Face").

Charlie Brown nervously enters the spelling bee and defeats his classmates. As he studies for the school championship, he and Linus sing a spelling mnemonic ("I Before E") as Snoopy accompanies them on a Jew's harp. In class the next day, Charlie Brown freezes when challenged with perceive, but recovers when Snoopy plays the song's accompaniment outside the classroom window. Crowned champion, his classmates cheerfully follow him home and sing ("Champion Charlie Brown"). Lucy proclaims herself his agent, and when his friends suggest that he continue studying, he is confused. They tell Charlie Brown that he must now take part in the National Spelling Bee in New York City, and he is again filled with self-doubt. As Charlie Brown leaves, Linus reluctantly offers him his blanket for good luck, and the other kids cheer for him.

Back at home, Linus suffers terrible withdrawal after being separated from his blanket. Unable to withstand without it, he pleads with Snoopy to go to New York City and help him recover it. They meet with an exhausted Charlie Brown in his hotel room, but he does not know where he left Linus' blanket. After searching outside of the hotel, they return to him, only to find him absentmindedly using the blanket as a shoe-shine cloth. Linus joins Snoopy in the audience as Charlie Brown competes; the other kids watch the contest at home on television. One-by-one, the other contestants are eliminated until only Charlie Brown and one other boy remain. Although Charlie Brown spells several words correctly (fussbudget, disastrous and incompetent), he is eliminated when he accidentally misspells beagle as B–E–A–G–E–L (Snoopy's breed), much to his and everyone else's frustration. Lucy, who is equally ashamed that Charlie Brown lost, says he made her mad and turns off the TV angrily.

Despite finishing as the national runner-up, Charlie Brown returns home, depressed, along with Linus and Snoopy. The next day, Linus visits him. He has been in his bed all day and refuses to see or talk to anybody. Linus tells him that the other kids missed him at school and that his baseball team finally won their first game of the season, but Charlie says he will never return to school or do anything again. As Linus leaves, he now points out that the world did not end despite his failure. He thinks for a moment, gets dressed, and goes outside. He sees the other kids playing, and when he spots Lucy as she plays with a football, he sneaks up behind her to kick it. She pulls it away and welcomes him home and the two look at the camera before the film fades to black.

Cast 
 Peter Robbins as Charlie Brown
 Pamelyn Ferdin as Lucy van Pelt
 Glenn Gilger as Linus van Pelt
 Andy Pforsich as Schroeder
 Sally Dryer as Patty
 Bill Melendez as Snoopy
 Anne Altieri as Violet
 Erin Sullivan as Sally Brown
 Lynda Mendelson as Frieda
 Christopher DeFaria as Pig-Pen

Shermy appears in this film but doesn't have a speaking role. Peppermint Patty and 5 also appear in silent roles.

Production

Development 
The film was partly based on a series of Peanuts comic strips originally published in newspapers in February 1966. That story had a much different ending: Charlie Brown was eliminated in his class spelling bee right away for misspelling the word maze ("M–A–Y–S" while thinking of baseball legend Willie Mays), thus confirming Violet's prediction that he would make a fool of himself. He then screams at his teacher in frustration, causing him to be sent to the principal's office (A few gags from that storyline, however, were also used in You're in Love, Charlie Brown).

Music 

The film also included several original songs, some of which boasted vocals for the first time: "Failure Face", "I Before E" and "Champion Charlie Brown" (Before the film, musical pieces in Peanuts specials were primarily instrumental, except for a few traditional songs in A Charlie Brown Christmas.) Rod McKuen wrote and sang the title song. He also wrote "Failure Face" and "Champion Charlie Brown".

The instrumental tracks interspersed throughout the film were composed by Vince Guaraldi and arranged by John Scott Trotter (who also wrote "I Before E"). The music consisted mostly of uptempo jazz tunes that had been heard since some of the earliest Peanuts television specials aired back in 1965; however, for the film, they were given a more "theatrical" treatment, with lusher horn-filled arrangements. Instrumental tracks used in it included "Skating" (first heard in A Charlie Brown Christmas) and "Baseball Theme" (first heard in Charlie Brown's All-Stars). When discussing the augmentation of Guaraldi's established jazz scores with additional musicians, Lee Mendelson commented, "It wasn't that we thought Vince's jazz couldn't carry the movie, but we wanted to supplement it with some 'big screen music.' We focused on Vince for the smaller, more intimate Charlie Brown scenes; for the larger moments, we turned to Trotter's richer, full-score sound." Guaraldi's services were passed over entirely for the second Peanuts feature film, Snoopy Come Home, with Mendelson turning to longtime Disney composers, the Sherman Brothers, to compose the music score.

The segment during the "Skating" sequence was choreographed by American figure skater Skippy Baxter. A segment during the middle of the film, in which Schroeder plays the entire 2nd Movement of Beethoven's Sonata Pathétique was performed by Ingolf Dahl. Dahl also performs the excerpts of the 1st and 3rd movements which appear in the film and are also played by Schroeder. Only the 3rd Movement (Rondo: Allegro) can be found on A Boy Named Charlie Brown: Original Motion Picture Soundtrack and only as a shortened bonus track.

The film also features a Jew's harp, which Snoopy plays to help Charlie Brown with his spelling.

Vince Guaraldi's songs were mostly from other specials and included (in addition to "Skating" and "Baseball Theme") "Blue Charlie Brown", "Good Grief", "Snoopy Surfing", and "Linus and Lucy" (several renditions are featured, including 2 slowed down renditions, one in minor key, featured while Linus was looking for his blanket and of course, the traditional rendition when he finally finds it). Guaraldi also plays a rendition of "Champion Charlie Brown" in the opening credits on the piano.

The French-language version replaces Rod McKuen's vocals with a French version sung by Serge Gainsbourg, "".

A soundtrack album with dialogue from the film was released on the Columbia Masterworks label in 1970 titled A Boy Named Charlie Brown: Selections from the Film Soundtrack. The first all-music version was released on CD by Kritzerland Records as a limited issue of 1,000 copies in 2017, titled A Boy Named Charlie Brown: Original Motion Picture Soundtrack.

Reception 
The film premiered at the Radio City Music Hall in New York City, only the third animated feature to play there after Snow White and the Seven Dwarfs (1937) and Bambi (1942).

The film was well received by critics and holds a 95% rating at Rotten Tomatoes based on 22 reviews, with an average rating of 7.50/10.

Time praised its use of "subtle, understated colors" and its scrupulous fidelity to the source material, calling it a message film that "should not be missed." The New York Times Vincent Canby wrote: "A practically perfect screen equivalent to the quiet joys to be found in almost any of Charles M. Schulz's Peanuts comic strips. I do have some reservations about the film, but it's difficult—perhaps impossible—to be anything except benign towards a G-rated, animated movie that manages to include references to St. Stephen, Thomas Eakins, Harpers Ferry, baseball, contemporary morality (as it relates to Charlie Brown's use of his 'bean ball'), conservation and kite flying. "

The film was a success at the box office, earning $12 million. In its first week at Radio City Music Hall, it grossed $230,000, including a record $60,123 on Saturday, December 6. In its second week, it grossed $290,000 which made it number one in the United States.

A 1971 Associated Press story argued the success of the film "broke the Disney monopoly" on animated feature films that had existed since the 1937 release of Snow White and the Seven Dwarfs. "The success of 'Peanuts' started a trend", animation producer Fred Calvert told the AP, "but I hope the industry is not misled into thinking that animation is the only thing. You need to have a solid story and good characters, too. Audiences are no longer fascinated by the fact that Mickey Mouse can spit."

Awards and nominations 
The film was nominated for an Academy Award for Best Original Song Score, but lost to The Beatles' Let It Be.

Home media 
The film was first released on VHS and Betamax in July 1983 through CBS/Fox Video, before seeing another VHS, Betamax, and LaserDisc release in 1984, then several more in 1985, September 26, 1991, February 20, 1992, and 1995 by CBS Home Entertainment through 20th Century Fox Home Entertainment, and May 29, 2001 through Paramount Home Entertainment, before making its Region 1 DVD debut in the original 1.85:1 anamorphic widescreen aspect ratio on March 28, 2006, by Paramount Home Entertainment/CBS Home Entertainment (co-producer Cinema Center Films was owned by CBS). The DVD has more than six minutes of footage not seen since the 1969 test screening and premiere. The footage consists of new scenes completely excised from earlier home video releases (VHS, CED Laserdisc, Japanese DVD) and TV prints — most notably, a scene of Lucy's infamous "pulling-away-the-football" trick after her slide presentation of Charlie Brown's faults (and her instant replay thereof), as well as extending existing scenes. The film was released on Blu-ray on September 6, 2016, along with Snoopy Come Home, however, unlike the DVD releases, both films are presented in an open-matte 4:3 ratio. The film earned $6 million in rentals.

See also 
 Peanuts filmography
 Snoopy, Come Home
 Race for Your Life, Charlie Brown
 Bon Voyage, Charlie Brown (And Don't Come Back!)

References

External links 

 
 
 
 

Peanuts films
1969 films
1969 animated films
1960s American animated films
1960s musical comedy-drama films
American children's animated comedy films
American musical comedy-drama films
Children's comedy-drama films
Cinema Center Films films
Comics adapted into animated films
1960s English-language films
Films about spelling competitions
Films based on American comics
Films directed by Bill Melendez
Animated films set in New York City
Peanuts music
Films with screenplays by Charles M. Schulz
1969 directorial debut films
1960s children's animated films
Animated films about children